Misheck Kagurabadza is a businessman and former mayor of Mutare, Zimbabwe, and is the MDC-Tsvangirai member of the house of assembly (MP) for the parliamentary constituency of Mutasa South.

References

Year of birth missing (living people)
Living people
Members of the National Assembly of Zimbabwe
Mutare
Mayors of places in Zimbabwe
Movement for Democratic Change – Tsvangirai politicians